André Du Ryer, Lord of La Garde-Malezair (b. Marcigny, Bourgogne, c. 1580; d. 1660 or 1672) was a French orientalist who  produced the third western translation of the Qur'an.

Biography
Du Ryer was diplomatic envoy to Constantinople and French consul to Alexandria.

In 1630, he published a grammar of the Turkish language in Latin. In 1634, he translated Gulistan, or the Empire of the Roses, by the Persian writer Sa'di. In 1647, he published the first integral translation of the Quran into a European vernacular language (the previous two translations from the Arabic had been into Latin). The book was interdicted by the Council of Conscience under the pressure of one of its members, Vincent de Paul. This censure did not impede the book's diffusion. Du Ryer left in manuscript a Turkish-Latin dictionary.

He became Secretary-Interpreter of King Louis XIII for Oriental languages after his return to France in the year 1630. Louis XIII assigned him to a mission in Persia, to take up negotiations with the king of that eastern land, at the finalizing of his accord concerning commercial exchanges between France and Persia. The Ottoman Sultàn Murat IV, who attentively supervised Franco-Persian relations, solemnly received André Du Ryer in 1632 and retained the Frenchman awhile at his court, for to send him back to Paris with a friendly letter to the French king.

Sources vary as to whether he died in 1660 or 1672.

Works
 Grammaire turque (1630)
 Gulistan, ou l'empire des roses (1634)
 L'Alcoran de Mahomet (1647)

See also
Islamic scholars

References

External links
The Nativity of Jesus, Blesséd be He, in the Koran
Andre Du Ryer and Oriental Studies in Seventeenth-Century France (Studies in the Arcadian Library)

French orientalists
Translators of the Quran into French
17th-century French writers
17th-century French male writers
French Iranologists
Linguists from France
French Arabists
Translators from Persian
Translators to Latin
17th-century Latin-language writers